The 1964 Michigan Wolverines football team represented the University of Michigan in the 1964 Big Ten Conference football season.  In its sixth year under head coach Bump Elliott, Michigan compiled a 9–1 record, won the Big Ten Conference championship for the first time since 1950, and defeated Oregon State in the 1965 Rose Bowl by a score of 34–7.  The 1964 Wolverines defeated four teams ranked in the Top 10 in the AP Poll by a combined score of 82 to 17 and finished the regular season ranked No. 4 in both the AP and Coaches' polls.  Although no post-bowl polls were taken in the 1964 season, Oregon State coach Tommy Prothro opined after watching game film from the Rose Bowl that the 1964 Wolverines were "the greatest football team he has ever seen."

On offense, Michigan scored 235 points, an average of 23.5 points per game, and averaged 349 yards of total offense per game.  The offense was led by quarterback Bob Timberlake who was selected as a first-team All-American.  Timberlake was a triple threat who rushed for 631 yards, passed for 884 yards, and also handled field goals and extra points.  The 1964 team had a strong running game with Mel Anthony and Carl Ward in the backfield.  Totaling 2,473 rushing yards for the season, the Wolverines had four games (Air Force, Minnesota, Northwestern, and Oregon State) in which they rushed for over 300 yards.

On defense, Michigan had three shutouts (a feat not accomplished by a Michigan team since 1948) and gave up only 83 points, an average of 8.3 points per game.  Team leaders on defense included All-American defensive tackle Bill Yearby, All-Big Ten linebacker Tom Cecchini, and team captain and All-Big Ten player Jim Conley. The 1964 team also included at least 16 players who went on to play professional football, including offensive guard Tom Mack (13 years in the NFL, 11 Pro Bowl appearances), defensive back Rick Volk (12 years in the NFL, three Pro Bowl appearances), linebacker Frank Nunley (10 years in the NFL), linebacker Bill Laskey (10 years in the AFL/NFL), and defensive back John Rowser (10 years in the NFL).

The Wolverines narrowly missed an undefeated season, with their only loss coming against a Purdue team led by Bob Griese by a score of 21–20. Michigan had a chance to tie the game in the fourth quarter, but Timberlake carried the ball for an attempted two-point conversion and was stopped short of the goal line.

Schedule

Season summary

Pre-season
In the 1962 and 1963 seasons, Michigan compiled a record of 5–11–2 and finished in tenth and seventh place in the Big Ten Conference.  The Wolverines had not won a Big Ten Conference championship since 1950.  Expectations were higher in 1964 with Michigan returning most of its starters from the 1963 season, including starting quarterback (Bob Timberlake), leading rusher (Mel Anthony), leading receiver (John Henderson), and leading kick returner (Jack Clancy).  When some reporters wrote that Michigan should win the Big Ten championship or finish in the top five nationally in 1964, head coach Bump Elliott sought to manage expectations.  Elliott stated:"Some people think we'll be a real good football team but I'll say that's not realistic at this time. . . . I'm not saying there isn't reason for us to be highly optimistic.  We have 20 of our top 33 players back, and we'll have a veteran in every spot, two deep in some.  But there are a million things to be proven before anyone can point to us as a team that can go all the way.  I'd say we'll have a sound, reasonable team, and rating it a dark horse or less is being realistic at this time."

Week 1: Air Force

Michigan opened the 1964 season with a 24–7 victory over Air Force.  The game drew a crowd of 66,888 to Michigan Stadium for the annual Band Day.  On the game's third play, Michigan forced a fumble by Air Force and recovered the ball at the Air Force 32-yard line. Following the turnover, quarterback Bob Timberlake scored on a one-yard touchdown run.  Timberlake also led Michigan on two 80-yard touchdown drives.  Mel Anthony scored a touchdown on a four-yard run in the second quarter, and Timberlake kicked a 26-yard field goal at the end of the first half.  Michigan was aided by four Air Force fumbles in the first half, three of which were recovered by Michigan.  The only scoring in the second half came on a 10-yard touchdown run by Jim Detwiler.

Week 2: Navy

In the second game of the season, Michigan defeated Navy 21–0.  Navy came into the game ranked No. 5 in the country.  The game was marked by 11 turnovers, six by Navy and five by Michigan.  Navy quarterbacks threw three interceptions, including two thrown by 1963 Heisman Trophy winner Roger Staubach.  Staubach completed 16 of 30 passes for 166 yards.  Staubach was eventually forced from the game, limping after being knocked to the turf by Michigan defensive tackle Bill Yearby.  The game broke a 20-game streak during which the Midshipmen had not been shut out under Staubach.  The New York Times wrote that the Wolverines "brought Roger Staubach, the heroic middie quarterback, back into focus as an ordinary mortal."  Michigan wingback Carl Ward rushed for 74 yards on 18 carries and scored two of Michigan's three touchdowns.  Fullback Dave Fisher scored Michigan's final touchdown in the third quarter.  Michigan quarterback Bob Timberlake completed 7 of 11 passes for 106 yards but threw two interceptions.  Michigan linebacker Tom Cecchini had two fumble recoveries and an interception in the game.

Week 3: at Michigan State

In the third game of the season, Michigan went on the road to open its Big Ten Conference schedule against Michigan State.  Coming into the game, Michigan had lost six straight games to the Spartans and had not defeated them since 1955.  The game matched two teams ranked in the Top 10 in the AP Poll and attracted "the largest crowd ever assembled at Spartan Stadium" up to that time.  Writing in The New York Times, R. W. Apple, Jr., wrote that the intrastate rivalry "means to the people of Michigan what the struggle between the Capulets and Montagues did to the citizens of 15th-century Verona."

Michigan State scored its only touchdown in the first quarter after recovering a fumble recovery off an errant pitch from Timberlake to Anthony. Another highlight for Michigan State came when sophomore receiver Gene Washington impressed observers with "a spectacular leaping grab for 43 yards."

Trailed 10 to 3 halfway through the fourth quarter, Michigan scored 14 points in the final seven minutes on a comeback led by sophomore halfback Rick Sygar.  With seven minutes remaining, Sygar caught a five-yard touchdown pass from Timberlake.  On the final drive, he took a pitch from Timberlake at the Michigan State 31-yard line and threw a touchdown pass to John Henderson.  Having missed a two-point conversion attempt on the first Michigan touchdown, Timberlake threw to Steve Smith for the two-point conversion on the final score.  Michigan defeated the Spartans 17–10.  Mel Anthony rushed for 70 yards on 21 carries, and John Henderson had 82 receiving yards on three catches.

Week 4: Purdue

The Wolverines suffered their only loss in week 4 against the Purdue Boilermakers. In a game played at Michigan Stadium, Purdue won a close game by a score of 21–20.  Michigan took the opening kickoff and drove 71 yards for a touchdown and a 7–0 lead.  Quarterback Bob Timberlake ran four yards for the opening touchdown and threw a 17-yard touchdown pass to Steve Smith in the second quarter.  Timberlake had one of his best games, rushing for 113 yards and two touchdowns on 18 carries and passing for 145 yards and a touchdown.  However, the Purdue offense, led by Bob Griese and aided by three Michigan turnovers, scored touchdowns in each of the first three quarters.  Griese completed a 66-yard touchdown pass to Jim Morel in the first quarter.  Purdue's second touchdown followed a Timberlake fumble after being hit with his arm fully cocked to pass the ball.  Purdue recovered at the Michigan 26-yard line and drove for a touchdown to tie the game at 14–14.  In the third quarter, Griese threw a three-yard touchdown pass to Randy Minnlear to give the Boilermakers a 21–14 lead.

In its opening drive of the fourth quarter, Michigan drove deep into Purdue territory, but Jim Detwiler fumbled at the three-yard line and Purdue recovered the ball in its own endzone.  On the next drive, Bob Timberlake ran 54 yards for a touchdown, and Michigan had the option to kick an extra point to tie the game or go for the lead with a two-point conversion.  Coach Elliott called for the two-point conversion; Timberlake carried the ball on an end run but was stopped short of the goal line. Michigan's defense forced punts on the next two Purdue drives, but Michigan was unable to score on its final drives.  The Wolverines fumbled on one drive and failed to convert a fourth down on the final drive.  The Wolverines lost despite outgaining the Boilermakers 435 yards to 268.

Week 5: Minnesota

In the fifth game of the season, Michigan defeated Minnesota 19–12 in Ann Arbor.  Prior to 1964, Michigan had lost four consecutive games in the annual contest for the Little Brown Jug.  Michigan led the game 19–0 in the fourth quarter and held off a comeback attempt by the Golden Gophers.  Minnesota scored two fourth-quarter touchdowns, but missed twice on two-point conversion attempts.  The Golden Gophers closed the score to 19–12 on a 91-yard interception return by Kraig Lofquist. They subsequently drove to the Michigan three-yard line, but the Michigan defense held on fourth down.

Michigan gained 311 rushing yards in the game, including 102 yards by Carl Ward, 98 yards by Mel Anthony and 79 yards by Bob Timberlake.  Michigan's scoring came on touchdown runs by Anthony and Timberlake, a field goal and two extra points by Timberlake, and a safety.

Week 6: Northwestern

Michigan had its most dominating performance to date in week 6 with a 35–0 win over Northwestern in Ann Arbor.  The Wolverines continued with a dominating ground attack, rushing for 336 yards in the game.  Eleven players gained positive rushing yardage for Michigan, including Bob Timberlake (81 yards), Carl Ward (57 yards), Jim Detwiler (50 yards), Mel Anthony (50 yards), Dave Fisher (44 yards), and Bruce Allison (25 yards).  Timberlake ran for two touchdowns and completed 9 of 15 passes for 84 yards, giving him 165 yards of total offense.  Rick Volk also threw a 33-yard touchdown pass to John Henderson in the second quarter.  Michigan's defense held the Wildcats to only 44 rushing yards to give the Wolverines their second shutout of the year.

Week 7: Illinois

Michigan hosted Illinois in the seventh game of the 1964 campaign.  The Wolverines defeated the Illini by a score of 21–6. After failing to convert a first down in the first quarter, Michigan scored two touchdowns in the second quarter on a run by Carl Ward and a 24-yard pass from Bob Timberlake to Jim Detwiler.  Michigan's first touchdown followed an interception by Frank Nunley at the Illinois 36-yard line, and the second touchdown followed a fumble recovery by Gerald Mader.  In the third quarter, Timberlake ran the ball for a touchdown from the one-yard line to conclude a 91-yard drive. The game marked the fifth consecutive victory for Michigan coach Bump Elliott against his brother, Illinois coach Pete Elliott.  The Elliott brothers played together in the backfield of Michigan's undefeated 1947 "Mad Magicians" team.

Week 8: at Iowa

In the eighth game of the season, Michigan defeated Iowa on the road 34–20.  Michigan took advantage of seven turnovers by Iowa, all inside the Iowa 30-yard line.  Mel Anthony rushed for 121 yards and scored three touchdowns on 20 carries.  Bob Timberlake contributed 216 yards of total offense with 80 rushing yards and 134 passing yards.  Timberlake had a 14-yard touchdown run and also threw a touchdown pass to John Henderson.  Despite throwing three interceptions, Iowa quarterback Gary Snook completed 13 passes and broke the Big Ten Conference record for the most pass completions in a season.  With six catches in the game, Iowa's Karl Noonan also broke the conference record for most pass receptions in a season.

Week 9: at Ohio State

Michigan concluded its regular season with a 10–0 victory over Ohio State in Columbus.  The game was played with winds blowing at 23 miles an hour and temperatures in the low 20s.  Michigan scored its first touchdown on a 17-yard touchdown pass from Bob Timberlake to Jim Detwiler with 44 seconds remaining in the first half.  The touchdown followed a 50-yard punt by Stan Kempe.  Ohio State's Bo Rein lost the punt in the sun, fumbled, and the ball was recovered by John Henderson.   The only other points in the game came on a 27-yard field goal by Timberlake.  With the victory, Michigan won the Big Ten Conference championship for the first time in 14 years.

Rose Bowl: Oregon State

 
As the Big Ten Conference champion, Michigan played in the 1965 Rose Bowl, defeating the Oregon State Beavers, 34–7. The game marked Michigan's fourth appearance in the Rose Bowl.  In its three prior appearances (1902, 1948, and 1951), Michigan was 3–0 and had outscored opponents 112–6.  Michigan was selected as an 11-point favorite over Oregon State.

After a scoreless first quarter Oregon State took a 7–0 lead with a five-yard touchdown pass from Paul Brothers to Doug McDougal.  Later in the second quarter, Michigan scored its first touchdown of the game on an 84-yard run by Mel Anthony. Anthony's run broke the Rose Bowl record for the longest run from scrimmage.  Dick Sygar missed the extra point, and Oregon State led 7–6.  On Michigan's next drive, Carl Ward ran 43 yards for a touchdown.  Michigan missed an attempted two-point conversion on an incomplete pass from Timberlake to Ben Farabee, and Michigan led 12–7 at halftime.

In the second half, Michigan's defense shut out the Beavers 22 to 0.  Mel Anthony, who scored three touchdowns in the game, was named the Player Of The Game.  Michigan totaled 332 rushing yards with 10 players gaining positive rushing yards.  Michigan's leading rushers were Mel Anthony (123 yards), Carl Ward (88 yards), Bob Timberlake (57 yards) and Dave Fisher (30 yards).  The Michigan defense held Oregon State to 64 rushing yards in the game.

After studying game film from the Rose Bowl, Oregon State coach Tommy Prothro said he was convinced that the 1964 Michigan team was "the greatest football team he has ever seen."  Prothro added, "The pictures are really interesting.  There were times when our players blasted Michigan players at full speed and only wound up flat on their backs with the other people on top of them.  I've never seen such hitting."

Players

Statistical leaders

Rushing

Passing

Receiving

Kickoff returns

Punt returns

Starting lineup

Mel Anthony, Cincinnati, Roger Bacon H.S. – 6 games at fullback
David Butler, Detroit, Henry Ford H.S. – 8 games at left guard
Tom Cecchini, Detroit, Pershing H.S. – 2 games at center
Jim Conley, Springdale, Pennsylvania – 4 games at left end
Jim Detwiler, Toledo, Ohio, DeVilbiss H.S. – 6 games at left halfback
Ben Farabee, Holland, Michigan – 3 games at left end
John Henderson, Dayton, Ohio, Roosevelt H.S. – 7 games at right end
Bill Keating, Chicago, St. Patrick's H.S. – 1 game at right guard
Charles Kines, Niles, Ohio, McKinley H.S. – 8 games at left tackle
Bill Laskey, Milan, Michigan – 3 games at right end
Tom Mack, Bucyrus, Ohio, Cleveland Heights H.S. – 7 games at right tackle
John Marcum, Monroe, Michigan – 8 games at right guard
Bob Mielke, Chicago, Carl Schurz H.S. – 1 game at right guard
Frank Nunley, Belleville, Michigan – 1 game at center
Brian Patchen, Steubenville, Ohio, Catholic Central H.S. – 7 games at center
Dick Rindfuss, Niles, Ohio, McKinley H.S. – 3 games at right halfback
Arnie Simkus, Detroit, Cass Tech H.S. – 2 games at left guard
Stephen C. Smith, Park Ridge, Illinois, Maine East – 3 games at left end
Dick Sygar, Niles, Ohio, McKinley H.S. – 4 games at fullback
Bob Timberlake, Franklin, Ohio – 10 games at quarterback
Rick Volk, Wauseon, Ohio – 4 games at left halfback
Carl Ward, Cincinnati, Taft H.S. – 6 games at right halfback
Dick Wells, Grand Rapids, Michigan, Ottawa Hills H.S. – 1 game at right halfback
John Yanz, Chicago, DeLaSalle H.S. – 2 games at left tackle
Bill Yearby, Detroit, Eastern H.S. – 3 games at right tackle

Awards and honors

 Captain: Jim Conley
 All-Americans: Bob Timberlake (AP, FWAA, FN) and Bill Yearby (NEA CP, FN)
Academic All-American: Timberlake (first team)
 All-Conference: Bob Timberlake, Bill Yearby, Jim Conley, and Tom Cecchini
 Most Valuable Player: Bob Timberlake
 Meyer Morton Award: Tom Mack
 John Maulbetsch Award: Clayton Wilhite

Players advancing to NFL and CFL

Michigan's 1964 team featured at least 16 players who went on to play professional football, including:
 Tom Mack, offensive guard (13 years in the NFL, 11 Pro Bowl appearances)
 Rick Volk, defensive back (12 years in the NFL, three Pro Bowl appearances)
 Frank Nunley, linebacker (10 years in the NFL)
 John Rowser, defensive back (10 years in the NFL, led the NFL in interceptions returned for touchdowns in 1971 and 1973)
 Bill Laskey, linebacker (10 years in the AFL/NFL)
 Mike Bass, defensive back (eight years in the NFL)
 Stephen C. Smith, end (eight years in the NFL)
 Wally Gabler, backup quarterback (seven years in the CFL)
 John Henderson, end (eight years in the NFL)
 Jack Clancy, end (three years in the NFL)
 Carl Ward (three years in the NFL)
 Arnie Simkus, defensive lineman (two years in the NFL)
 Bill Keating, lineman (two years in the NFL)
 Mel Anthony, fullback (two years in the CFL)
 Bill Yearby, defensive end (one-year NFL career shortened by knee injury)
 Bob Timberlake, quarterback (one year in the NFL)
Jim Detwiler was a first-round pick in the 1967 NFL Draft, but he underwent knee surgery and never played in the NFL.  Linebacker Tom Cecchini went on to become the defensive line coach for the Minnesota Vikings under Bud Grant.

Coaching staff
Head coach: Bump Elliott
Assistant coaches: Don Dufek, Dennis Fitzgerald, Henry Fonde, Robert Hollway, Tony Mason, Jack Nelson
Trainer: Jim Hunt
Manager: Bob Evans

References

External links
 1964 Football Team – Bentley Historical Library, University of Michigan Athletics History

Michigan
Michigan Wolverines football seasons
Big Ten Conference football champion seasons
Rose Bowl champion seasons
Michigan Wolverines football